Hesk Fell is a hill in the south-west of the English Lake District, between the Duddon Valley and Eskdale near Ulpha, Cumbria. It is the subject of a chapter of Wainwright's book The Outlying Fells of Lakeland. Wainwright admits that the fell "has many shortcomings" and that the view of Scafell Pike and its neighbours is "the only reward for the ascent".

References

  

Fells of the Lake District